The 2003 season was the 12th full year of competitive football (soccer) in Estonia since gaining independence from the Soviet Union on August 20, 1991.

National leagues

Meistriliiga

Esiliiga

Estonian FA Cup

Final

National team

External links
2003 season on RSSSF
RSSSF Historic Results
RSSSF National Team Results

 
Seasons in Estonian football